Park Güell is a privatized park system composed of gardens and architectural elements located on Carmel Hill, in Barcelona, Catalonia, Spain. Carmel Hill belongs to the mountain range of Collserola – the Parc del Carmel is located on the northern face. Park Güell is located in La Salut, a neighborhood in the Gràcia district of Barcelona. With urbanization in mind, Eusebi Güell assigned the design of the park to Antoni Gaudí, a renowned architect and the face of Catalan modernism.

The park was built from 1900 to 1914 and was officially opened as a public park in 1926. In 1984, UNESCO declared the park a World Heritage Site under "Works of Antoni Gaudí".

Description

Park Güell is the reflection of Gaudí's artistic plenitude, which belongs to his naturalist phase (first decade of the 20th century). During this period, the architect perfected his personal style through inspiration from organic shapes. He put into practice a series of new structural solutions rooted in the analysis of geometry. To that, the Catalan artist adds creative liberty and an imaginative, ornamental creation. Starting from a sort of baroquism, his works acquire a structural richness of forms and volumes, free of the rational rigidity or any sort of classic premises. In the design of Park Güell, Gaudí unleashed all his architectonic genius and put to practice much of his innovative structural solutions that would become the symbol of his organic style and that would culminate in the creation of the Basilica and Expiatory Church of the Holy Family (Catalan: Sagrada Família).

Güell and Gaudí conceived this park, situated within a natural park. They imagined an organized grouping of high-quality homes, decked out with all the latest technological advancements to ensure maximum comfort, finished off with an artistic touch. They also envisioned a community strongly influenced by symbolism, since, in the common elements of the park, they were trying to synthesize many of the political and religious ideals shared by patron and architect: therefore there are noticeable concepts originating from political Catalanism –  especially in the entrance stairway where the Catalan countries are represented – and from Catholicism – the Monumento al Calvario, originally designed to be a chapel. The mythological elements are so important: apparently Güell and Gaudí's conception of the park was also inspired by the Temple of Apollo of Delphi.

On the other hand, many experts have tried to link the park to various symbols because of the complex iconography that Gaudí applied to the urban project. Such references go from political vindication to religious exaltation, passing through mythology, history and philosophy. Specifically, many studies claim to see references to Freemasonry, despite the deep religious beliefs of both Gaudí and Count Güell. These references have not been proven in the historiography of the modern architect. The multiplicity of symbols found in the Park Güell is, as previously mentioned, associated to political and religious signs, with a touch of mystery according to the preferences of that time for enigmas and puzzles.

Origins as a housing development

The park was originally part of a commercially unsuccessful housing site, the idea of Count Eusebi Güell, after whom the park was named. It was inspired by the English garden city movement; the original English name Park (in Catalan the name is "Parc Güell"; in Spanish, "Parque Güell"). The site was a rocky hill with little vegetation and few trees, called Muntanya Pelada (Bare Mountain). It already included a large country house called Larrard House or Muntaner de Dalt House and was next to a neighbourhood of upper-class houses called La Salut (The Health). The intention was to exploit the fresh air (well away from smoky factories) and beautiful views from the site, with sixty triangular lots being provided for luxury houses. Count Eusebi Güell added to the prestige of the development by moving in 1906 to live in Larrard House. Ultimately, only two houses were built, neither designed by Gaudí. One was intended to be a show house, but on being completed in 1904 was put up for sale, and as no buyers came forward, Gaudí, at Güell's suggestion, bought it with his savings and moved in with his family and his father in 1906. This house, where Gaudí lived from 1906 to 1926 (his death), was built by Francesc Berenguer in 1904. It contains original works by Gaudí and several of his collaborators. It is now the Gaudí House Museum (Casa Museu Gaudí) since 1963. In 1969, it was declared a historical artistic monument of national interest.

Municipal garden 

It has since been converted into a municipal garden. It can be reached by underground railway (although the stations are at a distance from the Park and at a much lower level below the hill), by city buses, or by commercial tourist buses. Since October 2013 there is an entrance fee to visit the Monumental Zone (main entrance, terrace, viaducts, and the parts containing mosaics), so the entrance to the Park is no longer free. Limited tickets are available that often sell out in advance. Gaudí's house, "la Torre Rosa," – containing furniture that he designed – can be only visited for another entrance fee. There is a reduced rate for those wishing to see both Gaudí's house and the Sagrada Família Church.

Park Güell is designed and composed to bring the peace and calm that one would expect from a park. The buildings flanking the entrance, though very original and remarkable with fantastically shaped roofs with unusual pinnacles, fit in well with the use of the park as pleasure gardens and seem relatively inconspicuous in the landscape when one considers the flamboyance of other buildings designed by Gaudí. These two buildings make up the Porter's Lodge pavilion. One of these buildings contains a small room with a telephone booth.  The other, while once being the porter's house, is now a permanent exhibition of the Barcelona City History Museum MUHBA focused on the building itself, the park and the city.

The focal point of the park is the main terrace, surrounded by a long bench in the form of a sea serpent. The curves of the serpent bench form a number of enclaves, creating a more social atmosphere. Gaudí incorporated many motifs of Catalan nationalism, and elements from religious mysticism and ancient poetry, into the Park. Much of the design of the benches was the work not of Gaudí but of his often overlooked collaborator Josep Maria Jujol.

Roadways around the park to service the intended houses were designed by Gaudí as structures jutting out from the steep hillside or running on viaducts, with separate footpaths in arcades formed under these structures. This minimized the intrusion of the roads, and Gaudí designed them using local stone in a way that integrates them closely into the landscape. His structures echo natural forms, with columns like tree trunks supporting branching vaulting under the roadway, and the curves of vaulting and alignment of sloping columns designed in a similar way to his Church of Colònia Güell so that the inverted catenary arch shapes form perfect compression structures.

At the park's high-point, there is a stone hill composed of steps leading up to a platform which holds three large crosses. The official name of this is "El Turó de les Tres Creus," however many tourists choose to call it Calvary. Two of the crosses point north–south and east–west, the third, and tallest cross, points skyward. This lookout offers the most complete view of Barcelona and the bay. It is possible to view the main city in panorama, with the Sagrada Família (another one of Antoni Guadí's famous creations), the Agbar Tower, and the Montjuïc area visible at a distance.

The park supports a wide variety of wildlife, notably several of the non-native species of parrot found in the Barcelona area. Other birds can be seen from the park, with records including short-toed eagle. The park also supports a population of hummingbird hawk moths.

Gallery of images

See also
 List of Modernisme buildings in Barcelona
 Urban planning of Barcelona

References

External links

 Park Guell website

Antoni Gaudí buildings
Buildings and structures completed in 1914
Buildings and structures in Barcelona
Culture in Barcelona
Modernisme architecture in Barcelona
Mosaics
Gràcia
Guell
Visionary environments
Azulejos in buildings in Catalonia
Tourist attractions in Barcelona
World Heritage Sites in Catalonia